The Revolting World of Stanley Brown is a science-based British sitcom produced by the CBBC and aired on the CBBC Channel. The series follows 13-year-old Stanley Brown, who shares his insatiable curiosity about the revolting world around him with a chaotic time-traveller, Archie, and his best friends, Mike and Jess. Stanley is always in trouble but each week, he finds a new and exciting way to come out on top, delighting in the mess and mayhem the world throws at him. The series is produced by Retort Productions.

Premise
Stanley Brown is a normal but unusually curious kid, until his world changes in a way he least expects – with the arrival of his great, great, great, great, great, great... grandson, Archie. Archie has travelled back from the future to spend some time with his hero forefather, using technology destined to be invented by ideas initiated by Stanley and his descendants.

According to Archie (and his super computer, Olivia), Stanley's brilliant insights are what make him special – his curiosity, his ability to make connections, to experiment, evaluate, and persist in finding a solution where other people would give up.

In fact, according to Archie, Stanley Brown was the first in a line of geniuses who kick started loads of incredible advancements and inventions for future generations. Archie has arrived to witness first hand, observe, and learn from the brilliant Stanley Brown... as well as coming to have some fun.

Unfortunately, no one but Stanley can see or hear Archie, so there's no one but Archie who seems to understand or care what an amazing mind Stanley has. At the moment, nobody shares Archie's belief in Stanley – certainly not his mum or sister Steph, who both wish Stan was a little more 'average' and a lot less trouble.

Archie uses reality-bending powers to show us the unseen world around us in microscopic detail, covering a broad spectrum of content from human biology to physics via explosive chemistry and gory zoology. Together, the two of them open our eyes to the wonders of science – but often misjudge the impact of their experiments, as an explosion of science, comedy and chaos unfolds.

Archie's arrival may make Stanley's life a lot more complex, but it's a lot more fun too – even if he still has to cope with his mum's constant cleaning, as well as Jess the street-smart and confrontational girl next door, and having to look out for his accident-prone friend Mike. Stanley Brown has a lot on his plate, but if anyone can cope with the arrival of a back-packing time-travelling tourist, Stanley can!

Cast and characters
 Stanley Brown (Dean-Charles Chapman) – Stanley is the main character of the series. He is naturally inquisitive and into comics, gadgets and computer games, and often questions the way something works. He is a born leader, always at the centre of his gang of friends, able to look after himself and others. With a natural understanding of appliances he can operate the cooker, washer, dryer, and his mother's various gadgets better than anyone – but she has had to ban him from taking anything apart after losing count of household gadgets he 'seconded' and 'adapted' for his experiments. Depending what Archie is up to, Stanley often appears to friends and family to be distracted: daydreaming, inconsiderate, clumsy, talking to himself, forgetful, absent-minded or never where he should be. He struggles to live with the thought that one day he will become the greatest scientist ever, and sometimes wants to be a normal thirteen-year-old.
 Jessica "Jess" Palmer (Nell Williams) – Jess is Stanley's next-door neighbour. She is unashamedly different, cunning, deadpan, witty and street-smart. She is intrigued by Stanley's creative experiments, as well as his odd behaviour. At first, she regards Mike with pity and scorn, but comes to appreciate his loyalty and gutsiness. She soon forms a solid 'gang of three' with Stanley and Mike, often turning up unannounced in the shed or on Stan's doorstep.
 Mike (Louis Demosthenous) – Mike is Stanley's best friend. He is considered a weakling but is extremely loyal to his friend. Despite his physical limitations, Mike is determined to 'be the best' and become a soldier when he grows up, hence the fact he constantly references his involvement in the Junior Marines.
 Stephanie "Steph" Brown (Nicola Duffell) – Steph is Stanley's older sister. She is an outwardly well-behaved teenager but behind her mum's back, she takes delight in winding Stanley up. As far as Stanley is concerned, Steph annoyingly manages to 'side-step' the rules and take advantage of her first-born status.
Archie (Sy Thomas) – Archie is Stanley's great, great, great, great, great, great grandson from the future, having traveled back in time to observe and learn from his ancestor's legendary curiosity and love of disgusting novelty. He insists on not being Stanley's imaginary friend despite what his mother thinks. He considers himself to be Stanley's number one fan and in awe of his great ancestor. To Archie, visiting Stanley is like visiting a 'young Einstein' in the early years. But the reason he really wants to spend time with Stanley is because Archie is the first in his family not to carry the family brilliance that began with Stanley Brown. Thoughts and ideas bounce round Archie's head constantly, but he can only create problems, not solve them. Archie knows this, and believes that spending time with Stanley will teach him to be a 'proper' Brown, deserving of the family name. Only Stanley can see or hear Archie, as he uses OLIVIA, his super computer, to keep himself invisible to everyone else. Archie is shown as flamboyant, witty and energetic, with no social or personal inhibitions.
OLIVIA (Jocelyn Jee Esien) – OLIVIA is Archie's sentient mobile super computer. OLIVIA stands for Open Link Infinitely Variable Interactive Apparatus.
Daniel Palmer (Jaques Miché) – Daniel is Jess's older brother, and who Steph is besotted by. Daniel likes to think of himself as Mr. Popular, and assumes that others aspire to be just like him. Unlike his thick-skinned sister Jess, he's sensitive, and easily wounded by petty insults, especially if it has anything to do with his appearance.
Daisy (Rhyanna Alexander-Davies) – Daisy is Steph's best friend. Steph doesn't treat her very well, but Daisy doesn't seem to mind, often causing problems by her misunderstanding of simple instructions. She has a heart of gold and is always eager to please, although her honesty often gets in her in trouble, as she tells Steph things about her appearance that she doesn't want to hear.
Amanda Brown (Juliet Cowan) – Amanda is Stanley and Steph's mum. She runs her business selling beauty products door-to-door and takes pride in her appearance and home.

Episodes

Series 1 (2012)

References

External links
 
 

2010s British children's television series
2012 British television series debuts
2012 British television series endings
BBC children's television shows
BBC television sitcoms
English-language television shows
Television series by Fremantle (company)